Park Jin-ho (born 9 June 1977) is a South Korean Paralympic sport shooter. He won the bronze medal in the men's 10-metre air rifle standing SH1 event at the 2020 Summer Paralympics held in Tokyo, Japan. He also competed at the 2016 Summer Paralympics held in Rio de Janeiro, Brazil.

References

External links
 

Living people
1977 births
Place of birth missing (living people)
South Korean male sport shooters
Shooters at the 2016 Summer Paralympics
Shooters at the 2020 Summer Paralympics
Medalists at the 2020 Summer Paralympics
Paralympic medalists in shooting
Paralympic bronze medalists for South Korea
Paralympic shooters of South Korea
20th-century South Korean people
21st-century South Korean people